UDP-N-acetylglucosamine transferase subunit ALG14 homolog is a protein that in humans is encoded by the ALG14 gene.

Asparagine (N)-glycosylation is an essential modification that regulates protein folding and stability. ALG13 and ALG14 (this protein) constitute the UDP-GlcNAc transferase, which catalyzes a key step in endoplasmic reticulum N-linked glycosylation.

See also
 Congenital disorder of glycosylation

References

External links

Further reading